Sobotište is a village and municipality in Senica District in the Trnava Region of western Slovakia. In 1845 it was the location of the establishment of the first cooperative in Europe by Samuel Jurkovič (Spolok gazdovský).

Geography 
The municipality lies at an altitude of 252 metres and covers an area of 32.254 km2. It has a population of about 1536 people.

Districts 
 Sobotište
 Javorec

History 
In historical records the village was first mentioned in 1241.

People 
 Samuel Jurkovič (sk)
 Alois Kaiser, Austrian-US chazzan, composer
 Bogoslav Šulek (born Bohuslav Šulek), 1816 – 1895, Slovak-Croatian philologist, historian and lexicographer.

See also 
 26401 Sobotište

References

External links 

 Official page

Villages and municipalities in Senica District